The Cubic Corporation Classic was a golf tournament on the LPGA Tour, played only in 1974. It was played at the Stardust Country Club in San Diego, California. Sandra Palmer won the event by one stroke over Kathy McMullen.

References

Former LPGA Tour events
Golf in California
Sports competitions in San Diego
Women's sports in California